Promise Me, Dad: A Year of Hope, Hardship, and Purpose  is a 2017 memoir by then-former Vice President of the United States (and later 46th President) Joe Biden. It was first published by Flatiron Books.

Contents
Biden reflects on losing his eldest son Beau to brain cancer and the toll it took on him and his family. He describes his late son as having "all the best of me, but with the bugs and flaws engineered out." Biden also talks about the political implications his son's death had: his decision not to run for president in 2016 was in large part due to the grief he was still processing. He was further discouraged from running by Hillary Clinton's entry into the race and President Obama's implied preference that Biden not dilute her support in the primary elections.

The title of the book was inspired by a conversation Biden had with Beau after his cancer had progressed significantly. Coming to terms with his own mortality, Beau assured his father that no matter what happened, he would be okay. He then asked his father to promise the same in return.

Reception
Vanity Fair called the book "a brisk, often uplifting read, a consequence of its author’s congenital jollity and irrepressible candor."

References

External links
Excerpt on Google Books

2017 non-fiction books
American political books
Books by Joe Biden
English-language books
Flatiron Books books
American memoirs
Political memoirs
Books written by presidents of the United States